Edward Stourton, 10th Baron Stourton (c. 1555 – 7 May 1633) was a younger son of Charles Stourton, 8th Baron Stourton and Lady Anne Stanley, daughter of Edward Stanley, 3rd Earl of Derby. His father was executed for murder in 1557. He succeeded his brother John in 1588.

In 1605, in the aftermath of the Gunpowder Plot, Edward was imprisoned in the Tower of London due to his having received a letter from his cousin and brother-in-law, Sir Francis Tresham, telling him to be absent from Parliament. Francis was one of the leading conspirators in the plot. Nothing was proved against Edward and it emerged that several other Roman Catholic peers had received similar warnings. He was released without charge.

He married his cousin, Frances Tresham, daughter of Sir Thomas Tresham and Muriel Throckmorton. Edward and Frances had six surviving children and others who died in infancy. The six who survived were:
Margaret, who married Sir Thomas Sulyard, Knight, of Wetherden (Suffolk)
Mary, who married Walter Norton, Esquire, of Sibsey
William Stourton, 11th Baron Stourton (d. 25 April 1672)
Francis (1599–1638), who married Elizabeth Norton and had issue 
Thomas (died 1669)
Edward

Notes

References
 Kidd, Charles and Williamson, David (editors). Debrett's Peerage and Baronetage (1995 edition). London: St. Martin's Press, 1995, 
 Prob. 11/163/627, testament of 4 July 1632.
 Botolph, Charles, The History of the Noble House of Stourton, of Stourton, in the County of Wilts, 1899.
 

1633 deaths
10
Year of birth uncertain
16th-century English nobility
17th-century English nobility